Benoît Bickel (2 September 1900 – 10 December 1986) was a Swiss writer. His work was part of the literature event in the art competition at the 1948 Summer Olympics.

References

1900 births
1986 deaths
20th-century Swiss writers
Olympic competitors in art competitions
People from Sion, Switzerland